Kempowski may refer to:
 Walter Kempowski (1929–2007), a German author

 11789 Kempowski, a minor planet named after the author